Kevin O'Donovan may refer to:
 Kevin O'Donovan (Gaelic footballer)
 Kevin O'Donovan (basketball)